Brill may refer to:

Places
 Brielle (sometimes "Den Briel"), a town in the western Netherlands
 Brill, Buckinghamshire, a village in England
 Brill, Cornwall, a small village to the west of Constantine, Cornwall, UK
 Brill, Wisconsin, an unincorporated community, US
 Brill, Wuppertal, a quarter and town district, Germany

Literature
 Brill brothers (Mervall and Descant), fictional characters from the Artemis Fowl book series
 Brill (Elfquest), a fictional character in the comic Elfquest
 Brill Publishers, a Dutch international academic publisher

Scientific concepts
 Brill tagger, an algorithm in artificial intelligence to detect grammatical structures
 Brill–Noether theory, a theory of algebraic geometry
 Brill–Zinsser disease, a type of epidemic typhus which recurs in someone after a long period of dormancy

Company
 Brill Publishers, a Dutch international academic publisher
 Brill Tramway, a former branch line of the Metropolitan Railway from Quainton Road to Brill
 J. G. Brill Company, a defunct manufacturer of streetcars in North America
 USS Brill (SS-330), a World War II era American Balao class submarine

Other uses
 Brill (fish), a type of flatfish
 Brill (surname), for people who bear the family name Brill
 Brill Building, a New York City building notable for its influential music industry tenants

See also
 Bril, a surname
 Bril (disambiguation)
 Brühl (disambiguation)
 Brüll, a surname